The Reading Public Museum is a museum in West Reading, Pennsylvania. The museum's permanent collection mainly focuses on art, science, and civilization. It also has a planetarium and a  arboretum.

Collection

The museum's art collection contains works from many cultures but mainly focuses on European and American paintings and woodcuts. Its fine art collection includes more than seven hundred oil paintings by American and international artists. Works by Dale Chihuly and Abraham P. Hankins are in the museum's Modern and Contemporary holdings.

The museum's collection includes Nefrina, a mummy from the Ptolemaic period in ancient Egypt.

The museum has a large collection of Pennsylvania German objects.

See also
List of botanical gardens in the United States

References

External links
 Official website
Reading Public Museum within Google Arts & Culture

Museums in Reading, Pennsylvania
Natural history museums in Pennsylvania
Art museums and galleries in Pennsylvania
Arboreta in Pennsylvania
Planetaria in the United States
Museums established in 1907
1907 establishments in Pennsylvania
Paleontology in Pennsylvania